Robin Andrew Kemp (born 29 September 1984) is an English cricketer who played in four successive University Cricket Matches for Cambridge University against Oxford University between 2005 and 2008.

Robin Kemp was born on 29 September 1984 in Luton, Bedfordshire. He was educated at Bedford Modern School and St. John's College, Cambridge. He made his first-class debut in the university match played at Fenner's in the 2005 season, and maintained his place in the Cambridge side for the following three annual fixtures. His only other first-class appearance was for Cambridge UCCE against Derbyshire in 2007.

Kemp is a right-arm medium-pace opening or first change bowler. His best bowling was 3–23 against Oxford in 2008. In this game his bowling was particularly economical, and he returned match figures of 27.1-11-41-4. He is a right-handed tail-end batsman with a first-class average of 3 and a highest score of 7.

Kemp has also played for the Duke of Norfolk's XI, Quidnuncs, MCC and Bury St. Edmunds CC in the East Anglian Premier Cricket League.

He is now deputy head at Moulsham high school. And also teaches history and Economics]].

References 

1984 births
Cambridge University cricketers
People educated at Bedford Modern School
Living people
Alumni of St John's College, Cambridge
Cambridge MCCU cricketers
English cricketers
Cricketers from Luton
English cricketers of the 21st century